Phra Suddhidhammaransi Gambhiramedhacarya (1907–1961), commonly known as Ajahn Lee Dhammadharo, was a meditation teacher in the Thai Forest Tradition of the Dhammayuttika Nikaya order of Theravada Buddhism. He was born in the Ubon Ratchathani Province of Isan and was a student of Mun Bhuridatta.

Ajahn Lee is regarded as one of the greatest teachers and meditation masters of the Thai Forest Tradition of the 20th century. Among the forest monks, he devised the most comprehensive meditation instructions, and composed the most detailed map of the jhānas. He was one of the first teachers to bring the teachings of the Forest Tradition to the mainstream of Thai society. He never spoke of his own meditative attainments, however it was widely discussed among his students that he may have had psychic powers.

Biography
Ajahn Lee first attended school at age twelve, and left school at age seventeen. At this time, he was preoccupied with earning money, and had a plan for his early life where he would earn a life savings and marry at age 30.

After ordaining he reported being unsatisfied with the behavior of the monks surrounding him. The monks "played chess, held cock fights, and even ate food in the evenings."

Upon meeting Ajahn Mun, Ajahn Lee reordained in the Thammayut Order, where he wandered the forests as a thudong, a monk who observes the dhutanga. He travelled as far as Burma, Cambodia, and India.

After the rains in 1927, Ajahn Lee went back to the village where he was born (in modern-day Amnat District). As he stayed at a spirit shrine in a nearby village, his father found of his whereabouts and came and escorted him the rest of the way. When he arrived, he stayed in the villages cemetery, where the villagers refused to dwell near for fear of ghosts.

Ajahn Lee stayed here for several weeks, giving sermons to people who came from other villages. Ajahn Lee got the village people to take refuge in the Triple Gem. According to Ajahn Lee, he wanted to put an end to the villagers fear of the spirits. This made some of the villagers fearful and upset, and they became opposed to him being there. When the district officer stayed one day in the village, he sided with Ajahn Lee's agenda to rid the area of spirit worship and make Buddhist practice more orthodox.

References

Sources

External links

Books and Collections of Writings 
(Translated from the Thai by Ṭhānissaro Bhikkhu)
Food for Thought - Eighteen Talks on the Training of the Heart
Keeping the Breath in Mind and Lessons in Samadhi
Starting Out Small - A Collection of Talks for Beginning Meditators
Inner Strength & Parting Gifts
The Heightened Mind
The Skill of Release
The Craft of the Heart
Frames of Reference
Basic Themes - Four Treatises on Buddhist Practice
The Autobiography of Phra Ajaan Lee

1907 births
1961 deaths
People from Ubon Ratchathani province
Thai Theravada Buddhist monks
20th-century Buddhist monks